K&R may refer to:

 Kernighan and Ritchie (Brian Kernighan and Dennis Ritchie)
 The C Programming Language (book), a book written by Brian Kernighan and Dennis Ritchie
 K&R C, the original dialect of the C programming language, introduced by the first edition of the book
 K&R indent style, used in the book
 K&R Insurance, a kidnap and ransom insurance